Peta Gallagher (born 6 December 1977 in Canberra, Australian Capital Territory) is a female field hockey striker from Australia, who made her debut for the Australian women's national team during the Argentina Tour in 2001. Nicknamed Pete she was a member of the Hockeyroos at the 2004 Summer Olympics in Athens, Greece, where the team ended up in fifth place in the overall-rankings.

References
 Hockey Australia Profile
 sports-reference

External links
 

1977 births
Living people
Australian female field hockey players
Olympic field hockey players of Australia
Field hockey players at the 2004 Summer Olympics
Sportspeople from Canberra
20th-century Australian women
21st-century Australian women